Seren Anna Smale (born 13 December 2004) is a Welsh cricketer who currently plays for Lancashire and North West Thunder. She plays as a right-handed batter and wicket-keeper. She has previously played for Cheshire, as well as making appearances for North Representative XI and Cumbria in 2021.

Early life
Smale was born on 13 December 2004 in Wrexham. She plays club cricket for Wrexham Cricket Club.

Domestic career
Smale made her county debut in 2019, for Cheshire against Yorkshire. She scored 17* in her second and final match for Cheshire, against Worcestershire.

In 2021, Smale was named in the Lancashire squad, whilst also being dual-registered with Cumbria and appearing for North Representative XI.  She scored 76 runs in 6 matches across the tournament. She played for Lancashire in the 2022 Women's Twenty20 Cup, scoring 32 runs in two innings.

She was named in the North West Thunder Academy squad for the 2021 season. She was added to the full squad in September 2021, and made her debut for the side on 10 September, in a Rachael Heyhoe Flint Trophy match against Southern Vipers. Overall, she played three matches in the tournament, scoring 25 runs. She played two matches for North West Thunder in 2022, both in the Rachael Heyhoe Flint Trophy. Against Western Storm in the final match of the season, Smale scored her maiden half-century, making 57 as well as being part of Thunder's highest-ever opening partnership, of 87 with Deandra Dottin. In February 2023, it was announced that Smale had signed her first professional contract with North West Thunder.

International career
In October 2022, Smale was selected in the England Under-19 squad for the 2023 ICC Under-19 Women's T20 World Cup. She played six matches at the tournament, scoring 121 runs at an average of 30.25, including a Player of the Match performance against Pakistan.

References

External links

2004 births
Living people
Sportspeople from Wrexham
Welsh women cricketers
Cheshire women cricketers
Cumbria women cricketers
North Representative XI cricketers
Lancashire women cricketers
North West Thunder cricketers